The Mortal Kombat comic books series included the official Mortal Kombat comics by Midway and a licensed adaptation series by Malibu Comics that was published in 1994-1995. There are thus two different lineups of Mortal Kombat comics: the tie-ins published by Midway (some of them made by Mortal Kombat co-creator John Tobias) and DC Comics that closely followed the storyline of the games, and the Malibu series, which took a few liberties with the source material.

Comics published by Midway Games
The Midway comics were tie-ins published to coincide with the launches of Mortal Kombat, Mortal Kombat II, and Mortal Kombat 4. They offered insight into the backstory to each of the games as well as providing exposition of events occurring before each game.

Mortal Kombat Collector's Edition 
Mortal Kombat Collector's Edition
Midway's comic book prologue to the original Mortal Kombat was only released by mail order when the original arcade version was released in 1992. The mail order deal was displayed during the attract mode of the game. (This mode of advertising was also used in Mortal Kombat II.) The comic book would later be sold normally around the country, although it was close to impossible to get a copy outside of the United States. The comic was written and illustrated by John Tobias, the early Mortal Kombat series' designer artist. The final few pages offer character profiles for the seven playable characters in the original MK and the boss, Goro.

The comic begins by filling in the backstory of Shang Tsung, the Great Kung Lao, and Goro, whose victory in Mortal Kombat had meant a new dark era for the tournament. In the present day, where Liu Kang receives permission from Master Wu to fight in Mortal Kombat. Two weeks later, in Hong Kong, he boards a boat that will take him to the tournament island. Johnny Cage is also seen there, reassuring his agent and personal secretary who are afraid for his safety and the legitimacy of the tournament. Meanwhile, Kano and some members of his Black Dragon attempt to evade Sonya Blade, Agent Beran (whose name is not revealed here), and a man who is apparently Jax, as well as the rest of a U.S. Special Forces unit. Chased by Sonya, Kano leaps aboard the boat, all in accordance with his plan to loot all the riches he can find from Shang Tsung's palace.

In the mountains of rural Japan, Shang Tsung issues a challenge to Raiden, God of Thunder, inviting him to compete and reminding him that the tournament will be fought in his domain and under his rule. Back on the boat, Kano is trying to intimidate Cage and a fight breaks out, during which Liu Kang takes down Kano's associates. Sub-Zero watches the scene from above, unaware of the lurking spectre of Scorpion, who ambushes him from behind. Scorpion vows to kill Sub-Zero just as Sub-Zero killed Scorpion exactly two years ago. However, he states he is no mere murderer and, instead of killing the Sub-Zero on the boat, he will do so at the tournament. Sub-Zero says Scorpion is a fool to spare his life.

At the island, after a day of practice and training, Shang Tsung and Goro welcome the participants in the tournament and introduce the latest entrant, Sonya Blade, who had been trying to track Kano down to the island, but was captured and brought in by guards. Shang Tsung says that not only does Sonya's life depend on her performance, but so do the lives of her accompanying unit, who have also been captured. Goro then announces the start of the tournament and the story ends with the caption "To be continued...at an arcade near you!"

Mortal Kombat II Collector's Edition
Midway's comic book prologue to Mortal Kombat II was published by mail order during the release of the arcade version, much like with the original game's comic. Likewise, the second comic book reflects the events that were raised in the game and was also written, penciled, and colored by John Tobias. 100 million copies are said to had been printed.

The story begins with Johnny Cage recounting the events of the first game's final moments. He explains that Shang Tsung unleashed a horde of warriors on the Earthrealm fighters following Liu Kang's victory over Goro; and that Kano, Sonya, and himself were rushed by Goro at The Pit. Suddenly, an explosion knocked out the bridge from underneath them and everyone fell. Cage was saved, however, by Raiden, who informed him that Liu Kang had killed Shang Tsung and the island, which was held together by Tsung's presence, is self-destructing. Raiden further elaborates that Liu Kang has already escaped and, following the battle with Shang Tsung's army, Sub-Zero was killed by Scorpion, who then burst into flames and burned to ash before Raiden's eyes. The ensuing explosion apparently knocked Cage out and the next thing he recalls is seeing a U.S. military vessel. As it turns out, Cage has been telling the story to a disbelieving Jax and Lt. Steve Beran (a reference to Mortal Kombat series art director Steve Beran), who is more open to the story considering Cage has recounted the story five times with exactly the same details each time. Jax does not believe Cage's story on account of a distress signal from Sonya pinpointed to where they found Cage and because he thinks Sonya would never fight alongside Kano, even if, as Cage says, she had no choice. He nevertheless releases Cage due to lack of evidence.

Meanwhile, in Outworld, Shao Kahn is being addressed by King Gorbak, who laments his son, Goro's, apparent death and places the blame on the shoulders of Shang Tsung, who is alive in Outworld. Gorbak calls for Tsung's death, but Kahn gives him one chance to impress upon him why he should not personally slay him. Tsung instantly comes up with a plan: to lure the Earthrealm warriors to Outworld by breaching the dimensional gate and challenging them to Mortal Kombat. Only this time, the tournament will take place in Outworld and will be against the wishes of the Elder Gods. Kahn consults a Shadow Priest for advice and is told that due to the plan being against the wishes of the Elder Gods, it is impossible to clearly foresee the outcome. Should Kahn be victorious, his power will be unmatched and he will live for eternity. If the plan fails, however, Kahn will face eternal damnation. Gorbak says that if Tsung is to live then he will offer the services of Kintaro. As Shang Tsung's presence on Earthrealm no longer exists, Shao Kahn gives him a new physical form, one that is much younger in appearance. Kahn then sends Kitana, Mileena, Baraka, Kintaro, and Shang Tsung to destroy the Shaolin Monastery.

At the Special Forces base, a recording is received from Sonya and Kano that confirms Cage's story as true. Jax decides to make a trip to Hollywood to track down Cage. In China, Liu Kang has returned to Shaolin to find it ruined. The apparent sole survivor of the attacks, Kung Lao, appears from the shadows and sides with his friend by offering his word that he will fight against Outworld. At that moment, a Lin Kuei hover jet lands and a man in a suit claiming to be Sub-Zero hands Liu Kang his calling card. Liu Kang states that he saw Sub-Zero die and this man cannot possibly be the same person, but the ninja says he is the brother of the original Sub-Zero and remarks that his brother's unwillingness to adapt to technological change within the Lin Kuei is what made him obsolete. He shows the monks surveillance pictures the Lin Kuei took of Shang Tsung who appears to be searching for Cage, and the three then decide to journey to Hollywood. Cage is on set, filming a commercial for "Cage Cologne." (The director's name is "E. Boon" and bears resemblance to the franchise co-creator of the same name whilst the cameraman looks like fellow co-creator John Tobias.) At this point, Shang Tsung and the Outworld warriors sent by Kahn, flanked by numerous Masked Guards, arrive through a portal in the studio. As Jax and Beran demand to see Cage, he is blasted through the wall right in front of them and a massive fight breaks out. Sub-Zero's hover jet arrives about this time, being piloted by Smoke and a red-clad Lin Kuei member. Kung Lao and Liu Kang join the fight on Jax's side. Sub-Zero (now in his ninja uniform) leaps down and makes an attempt on Shang Tsung's life, but rebounds off an invisible Reptile. Before Reptile can kill Sub-Zero, however, Scorpion intervenes and attacks Reptile, saying he will defend Sub-Zero as penance for killing his brother. Before anything else can happen, though, Raiden arrives to stop the conflict. Shang Tsung now makes his challenge before returning to Outworld with his allies, leaving the Earthrealm warriors with the choice of accepting the challenge or forfeiting. Raiden informs Liu Kang that forfeit would weaken Earthrealm's standing with the Elder Gods and Liu Kang must accept the challenge. Jax is reluctant to join the tournament but is spurred on when Cage reveals Beran has been killed by Mileena. Sub-Zero also offers to compete. Raiden tells the gathered group of Jax, Liu Kang, Kung Lao, Johnny Cage, and Sub-Zero to "Prepare yourselves, Mortals—for Kombat in the Outworld!" The comic ends with the caption, "To be continued on a game screen near you!"

Mortal Kombat 4 Limited Edition
This comic book/artbook hybrid was created jointly by artists Alé Garza, Tomm Coker, Keron Grant, Garry Leach, Steve Pugh, and Mark Texeira. It was produced as a tie-in to the PlayStation and Nintendo 64 versions of Mortal Kombat 4, initially available as a pre-order incentive, and was later packaged with the PC CD-ROM version of the game.

Shinnok, ruler of the Netherrealm, is the first to emerge from the portal, followed by hundreds of demons, as well as the mysterious Reiko, and Scorpion, who is likely looking for another chance at life outside the Netherrealm. As Quan Chi, the one who gave Sindel the orb, discusses the success of the plan and says Tanya is to be thanked, Shinnok claims his true goal is to reach the heavens and confront the Elder Gods, and now he has that chance.

Several days later, in Earthrealm, Sub-Zero has travelled to the Temple of the Elements in China. He recalls what his elder brother, the original Sub-Zero, said: that the temple is home to an amulet designed to keep Shinnok in the Netherrealm. The amulet is protected by the elements of Wind, Earth, Water, and Fire (a reference to Mortal Kombat Mythologies: Sub-Zero). As Sub-Zero prepares to make peace with the elemental Gods, he sees what he believes to be a sign falling from the sky and decides to follow it after symbolically donning his mask once more out of respect not to the Lin Kuei, but to his brother. Miles away, Liu Kang quickly gets the upper hand, Kai jokes that this is easy enough for the Immortal Champion of Mortal Kombat. Suddenly, what Sub-Zero had seen falling from the sky collides with the ground near the monks. They inspect the scene and discover demons about to slit the throat of a white-haired man. Elsewhere, Sonya Blade is battling Jarek. Unable to get the upper hand over the last remaining Black Dragon clan member, Jarek escapes. Jax then contacts Sonya and tells her she is needed to investigate an interdimensional flux in southwestern China and a helicopter piloted by Johnny Cage is sent to pick her up. At the crater, Liu Kang and Kai battle the demons until Raiden shows up and destroys the demons. Raiden then explains that the man who fell from the sky is Fujin, God of Wind. He elaborates that he and Fujin are the last two remaining of Earth's Gods and that the Elder Gods have been weakened by Shinnok. He and Fujin withdraw to the Eternal Palace to formulate a plan of attack, after telling Liu Kang and Kai they must go to Edenia. Just as Kai is lamenting the impossibility of such a task, the helicopter carrying Sonya and Cage arrives. Sub-Zero too shows up to offer his help, correctly guessing that his brother may have played some part in Shinnok's return. Sonya uses Outer World Investigation Agency technology to open a portal to Edenia. On the other side, they are all greeted by Quan Chi, who welcomes the Earthrealm Warriors to a "Mortal Kombat like you've never seen before." The comic ends with the caption, "To be continued in Mortal Kombat 4."

Comics published by Malibu Comics

Comics published by DC Comics

Mortal Kombat VS DC Universe: Beginnings
This short comic was illustrated by returning John Tobias and written by John Vogel, another of the original four co-creators of the Mortal Kombat franchise. It is the backstory comic for the 2008 game Mortal Kombat vs. DC Universe, merging the worlds of Mortal Kombat and the DC Universe.

Mortal Kombat X

Mortal Kombat X: Blood Ties
DC Comics announced a prequel comic book series for Mortal Kombat X that "will feature many favorite characters and the next generation of Kombatants" as being written by Shawn Kittelsen with interior art by Dexter Soy and covers by Ivan Reis. The series debuted in January 2015.

Blood Ties begins several years after the end of the "Netherrealm War", when Shinnok led Netherrealm in an attempt to conquer Earth and the other realms in the wake of Shao Khan's death. Shinnok was defeated and his undead armies pushed back, save for a number of dead warriors who were restored to life. Meanwhile, Outworld fell into a civil war as Mileena was overthrown by her warchief Kotal Kahn. In the Himalayan wilderness, Kenshi and his son Takeda flee from members of the Red Dragon and are saved by Scorpion and his rebuilt Shirai Ryu clan. Kenshi explains that he was infiltrating the Red Dragon when he was exposed, causing the group to target his son, whom he did not know he had. Kenshi leaves Takeda with Scorpion and leaves to complete his mission and find the Red Dragon's leader. Meanwhile, Kuai Liang, the younger Sub-Zero (who has also been returned to life) attacks a Red Dragon Temple in China. He enters the inner chamber only to be attacked by Kano, who has taken the Kamidogu (which are daggers in this timeline) within and scars him with it, stating that the Kamidogu are cursed. 

Years later, Scorpion is approached by Raiden. After ensuring the Kamidogu is safe, he warns Scorpion of a demon from another realm that seeks to kill Earth's champions. Takeda's friend Fox is driven mad by voices: taking the Kamidogu, he is possessed by the demon and kills the rest of the Shirai Ryu, before being killed by Takeda and Scorpion. After paying their respects to the fallen, the two leave to find Raiden to seek answers. At the Sky Temple, Raiden converses with the Wind God Fujin, before using another dagger to invoke blood magic to find the demon. He discovers that they are too late and that events are already in motion. At a Special Forces base, Sonya Blade meets with Kotal Khan, Emperor of Outworld, who was captured entering Earth. Kotal explains that Mileena's resistance in Outworld is in league with the Red Dragon, and that he and his warriors are there to eliminate them. He asks for their cooperation, though Sonya refuses, and a fight ensues, but Raiden intervenes and Kotal departs, threatening to make them pay. Elsewhere, Sonya's daughter Cassie Cage, takes Jax's daughter Jacqui Briggs to what she believes to be a legal fight club, but are forced into an illegal death match against Frost. The match is interrupted by Black Dragon members Jarek and Tasia, who attempt to take Cassie and Jacqui. The two are sucked through a portal, but Cassie is able to take a picture of one of their abductors from her phone, Erron Black, one of the warriors who had been with Kotal, leaving it for Sonya. Sonya finds Cassie's phone and prepares to take her men and Johnny Cage (Cassie's father) to Outworld.

In Outworld, Kotal Khan sends his father to find Prince Goro who has disappeared while looking for Mileena. Unknown to Kotal, Goro has betrayed him and joined Mileena. Goro kills Kotal's father, driving Kotal to empower himself with his Kamidogu and face Goro personally, tearing his arms off. As Kotal and his warriors leave, they are confronted by Sonya demanding her daughter's location. Kotal denies involvement but agrees to help after Erron Black is shown to be involved. Elsewhere, Erron, Kano and the Black Dragon are taking Jacqui and Cassie to an unknown location when they are ambushed by Mavado and the Red Dragon. Kano abandons Erron who is wounded and the girls kill Mavado before being taken prisoner once more. In Earthrealm, Scorpion and Takeda near the Sky Temple and are attacked by Raiden, who is under the effects of the Kamidogu's curse. Takeda is seemingly killed, causing Scorpion to savagely beat Raiden, freeing him from the curse. Raiden saves Takeda's life and explains that following Shinnok's defeat the Elder Gods locked him away in another dimension. The Kamidogu were empowered with Blood Magic to act as the keys to his prison, and entrusted to powerful warriors by Raiden, keeping their true purpose and power hidden. Scorpion is furious at the deception. Raiden apologizes, explaining that he had not foreseen the demon corrupting the magic and cursing the blades. He informs him that all the blades are accounted for, save for one which has been stolen by Sub-Zero, who was possessed when Kano scarred him with one years earlier, and Scorpion agrees to help track him down. In Outworld, Mileena's chief advisor Reiko plots with the demon cleric Havik, who promises to grant him the power to become ruler of Outworld if he brings him the Kamidogu. Meanwhile, Sonya's team finds Erron Black who delivers a message that Reiko and Havik are waiting for them on Shang Tsung's island.

Mortal Kombat X: Blood Gods
In Z'unkahrah, a still wounded Erron Black kneels before Kotal Kahn and his enforcers, the gunslinger telling the emperor he has only ever meant to serve him, and begs for mercy. Kotal Kahn considers crushing Black's skull as his mercy, reminding Black that his misguided actions provoked a war with Earthrealm that Outworld cannot afford. Kotal Kahn asks Erron Black how they are supposed to repair this offense against Earthrealm, and Sonya interrupts by demanding safe passage to Shang Tsung's Island.

Sonya tells Kotal Kahn to pray that the girls are alive, and begins to break down at the prospect of them being dead. Johnny Cage tries to console her but Sonya rebuffs him. Kotal Kahn then orders Reptile and D'Vorah to take Erron Black back to his prison in the dungeon. The emperor then explains the loss of his own father and people at Reiko and Goro's hands simply to spite him, making him the last of his kind. Johnny gives Kotal his condolences and tells him he understands that he and Sonya will do whatever it takes to bring their family home.

Kotal understands completely and promises Johnny and Sonya his swiftest ship and a battalion of his finest soldiers to take them to Shang Tsung's Island to get the girls, vowing that Reiko will pay for his crimes. Sonya asks what the catch is and Kotal Kahn tells her they must survive the coming dawn. The emperor explains that after he humiliated Goro in their battle by cutting off his arms and sparing his life, he returned him to Kuatan expecting his father, King Gorbak, to reject and execute Goro.

But Kotal reveals that because he was blinded by vengeance, he overlooked a simple truth: That all fathers love their sons. Indeed, in Kuatan the subterranean kingdom of the Shokan, Goro kneels before his father Gorbak, who rises and bids his disabled son to rise, shedding a single tear as he does. Goro begs his father to kill him, claiming he is no longer a worthy heir, but Gorbak refuses and declares that the Shokan have suffered the indignity of imperial rule under an Osh-Tekk long enough. Deciding to act quickly, Gorbak sends an army of Shokan, led by their champion, Kintaro, to march on Z'unkahrah.

In Earthrealm, in the outskirts of the city of Kahishari, Japan, Hanzo and Takeda make their way towards the city, with Takeda shocked to learn his master has lost to Sub-Zero in the past. Hanzo calls it a technical loss and Takeda asks what his plan for a rematch is. Hanzo tells his apprentice he is before noting how quiet it is.

Takeda notices a nip in the air and Hanzo declares that Sub-Zero is close and orders Takeda to take out his sword. When Hanzo sees Lin Kuei cyborgs, he and Takeda move to attack them, but when Hanzo cuts one in half, Takeda sees that the cyborgs are frozen solid. Hanzo is quick to realize the entire city is frozen.

Hanzo knows Kuai Liang was never this powerful, even under Quan Chi's control, but Takeda reminds him that the Kamidogu is. Hanzo and Takeda follow the trail of ice and come upon Sub-Zero, Kamidogu dagger in hand, standing before a frozen temple, the voice of the demon corrupting the dagger whispering in Kuai's ear to avenge his brother's death and to kill the two Shirai Ryu for defying the Blood Code. Sub-Zero greets Hanzo before smashing the frozen temple to the ground with his bare hands.

Hanzo tells Sub-Zero that while killing him won't bring back the people he's murdered but it will stop him from hurting more. The demon takes complete possession of Sub-Zero to speak through him, asking Hanzo who will stop him when the true Scorpion is unleashed. Hanzo slips into his Scorpion persona, much to the demon's delight, and Scorpion warns Takeda that whoever possessed Fox and Raiden is controlling Sub-Zero.

On Shang Tsung's Island, in the Flesh Pits, the cleric of chaos Havik tears a corpse apart as he speaks through Sub-Zero, declaring that Sub-Zero and Scorpion will finally have their rematch and declares that the Kamidogu will soon be his, along with Hanzo Hasashi's soul.

Mortal Kombat X: Blood Island

References

External links
 Mortal Kombat at Comic Vine

Comics based on video games
DC Comics titles
Martial arts comics
Science fantasy comics
Works based on Mortal Kombat